The demographics of Virginia are the various elements used to describe the population of the Commonwealth of Virginia and are studied by various government and non-government organizations. Virginia is the 12th-most populous state in the United States with over  residents and is the 35th largest in area.

Population
As of the 2010 United States Census, Virginia has a reported population , which is an increase , or 3.6%, from a previous estimate in 2007 and an increase , or 13.0%, since the year 2000. This includes an increase from net migration of  into the Commonwealth from 2000-2007. Also in 2009, 6.7% of Virginia's population were reported as under five years old, 23.4% under eighteen, and 12.1% were senior citizens-65+. The center of population of Virginia is located in Goochland County outside of Richmond.

Birth data
Note: Births in table don't add up, because Hispanics are counted both by their ethnicity and by their race, giving a higher overall number.

Since 2016, data for births of White Hispanic origin are not collected, but included in one Hispanic group; persons of Hispanic origin may be of any race.

Race and ethnicity

The five largest reported ancestry groups in Virginia are: African American (19.6%), German (11.7%), American (11.4%), English (11.1%), and Irish (9.8%). Most of those claiming to be of "American" ancestry are actually of English descent, but have family that has been in the country for so long, in many cases since the early seventeenth century, that they choose to identify simply as "American". Most of Virginia's Black population are descended from enslaved Africans who worked its tobacco, cotton, and hemp plantations. Initially, these slaves came from west central Africa, primarily Angola. During the eighteenth century, however, about half of them were derived from various ethnicities located in the Niger Delta region of modern-day Nigeria. With continued immigration to Virginia of other European groups and the 19th-century sales of tens of thousands of enslaved Africans from Virginia to the Deep South, the percent of enslaved Africans fell from once being half of the total population.

In colonial Virginia the majority of free people of color were descended from marriages or relationships of white men (servants or free) and black women (slave, servant or free), reflecting the fluid relationships among working people.  Many free black families were well-established and headed by landowners by the Revolution. From 1782 to 1818, a wave of slaveholders inspired by the Revolutionary ideals of equality freed slaves, until the legislature made manumissions more difficult. Some African Americans freed were those whose fathers were white masters, while others were freed for service. By 1860 there were  people of color (black or mulatto, as classified in the census) in Virginia. Over the decades, many had gathered in the cities of Richmond and Petersburg where there were more job opportunities.  Others were landowners who had working farms, or found acceptance from neighbors in the frontier areas of Virginia.

The twentieth-century Great Migration of blacks from the rural South to the urban North reduced Virginia's black population to about 20%. Today, African-Americans are concentrated in the eastern and southern Tidewater and Piedmont regions where plantation agriculture was the most dominant. The western mountains were settled primarily by people of heavily Scots-Irish ancestry. There are also sizable numbers of people of German descent in the northwestern mountains and Shenandoah Valley.

Because of recent immigration in the late 20th century and early 21st century, there are rapidly growing populations from Latin America, Asia, Africa, and the Caribbean, especially in Northern Virginia. Northern Virginia, which is a part of the DC metropolitan area, is one of the most diverse regions in the country. Virginia has one of the largest Salvadoran populations in the US, the vast majority of which is concentrated in Northern Virginia. Northern Virginia also has the largest Vietnamese population on the East Coast, with about 48,000 Vietnamese statewide as of 2007, their major wave of immigration followed the Vietnam War. The Hampton Roads area in southeastern Virginia, though it lags far behind Northern Virginia in diversity, is the second most populous in the state compared to other metro areas; aside from 'native' blacks and whites, Hampton Roads only has large populations of Filipinos, Mexicans, and Puerto Ricans. The Hampton Roads area has the highest percentage of Puerto Ricans of any metropolitan area in the Southern US outside Florida, and also has a sizable Filipino population with about 45,000 in the area, many of whom have ties to the U.S. Navy. As of 2005, 6.1% of Virginians are Hispanic and 5.2% are Asian. Virginia also continues to be home to eight Native American tribes recognized by the state, though all lack federal recognition status. Most Native American groups are located in the Tidewater region.

Languages
The Piedmont region is known for its dialect's strong influence on Southern American English. While a more homogenized American English is found in urban areas, various accents are also used, including the Tidewater accent, the Old Virginia accent, Appalachian English, and the anachronistic Elizabethan of Tangier Island.

Religion

Virginia is predominantly Christian and Protestant; Baptists are the largest single group with 27% of the population as of 2008. Baptist denominational groups in Virginia include the Baptist General Association of Virginia, with about 1,400 member churches, which supports both the Southern Baptist Convention and the moderate Cooperative Baptist Fellowship; and the Southern Baptist Conservatives of Virginia with more than 500 affiliated churches, which supports the Southern Baptist Convention.

Roman Catholics are the second-largest religious group, and the group which grew the most in the 1990s. The Roman Catholic Diocese of Arlington includes most of Northern Virginia's Catholic churches, while the Diocese of Richmond covers the rest. The Virginia Conference is the regional body of the United Methodist Church. The Virginia Synod is responsible for the congregations of the Lutheran Church. The Episcopal Diocese of Virginia, Southern Virginia, and Southwestern Virginia support the various Episcopal churches. In November 2006, 15 conservative Episcopal churches voted to split from the Diocese of Virginia over its ordination of openly gay bishops and clergy; these churches continue to claim affiliation with the larger Anglican Communion through other bodies outside the United States. Though Virginia law allows parishioners to determine their church's affiliation, the diocese claims the secessionist churches' properties. The resulting property law case is a test for Episcopal churches nationwide.

Presbyterians, Pentecostals, Congregationalists, and Episcopalians each composed 1–3% of the population as of 2001. Among other religions, adherents of the Church of Jesus Christ of Latter-day Saints constitute 1.1% of the population, with 204 congregations in Virginia as of 2020. Fairfax Station is home to the Ekoji Buddhist Temple, of the Jodo Shinshu school, the Sikh Foundation of Virginia a Sikh Gurdwara, and the Hindu Durga Temple. Chesapeake, Virginia is home to the Guru Nanak Foundation of Tidewater Sikh Gurdwara. While a small population in terms of the state overall, organized Jewish sites date to 1789 with Congregation Beth Ahabah. Muslims are a rapidly growing religious group throughout the state through immigration. Megachurches in the state include Thomas Road Baptist Church, Immanuel Bible Church, and McLean Bible Church.

Gallery

See also
 Virginia census statistical areas
 Native American tribes in Virginia

References

 
Virginia